The Trachyceratidae is an extinct  family of ceratitid ammonoid cephalopods.

The Trachyceratidae makes up part of the superfamily Trachyceratoidea along with such families as the Buchitidae, Distichitidae, Dronovitidae and Noridiscitidae. The Trachyceratoidea is also known by the junior synonym Trachycerataceae.

Fossil record
Fossils of Trachyceratidae are found in marine strata from the Devonian to the Triassic.  Fossils are known from many localities in Afghanistan, Canada, China, Europe (Slovenia, Spain, Switzerland, Ukraine), India, Japan, the Russian Federation, Thailand, and the United States.

Description
Trachyceratid shells are more or less involute and highly ornamented. They have their whorl sides covered with flexuous ribs that are usually tuberculate. The venters generally have a median furrow bordered by rows of tubercles or continuous keels.

Classification
Trachyceratidae
Boreotrachyceras Konstantinov 2012
Brotheotrachyceras Urlichs 1994
Hannaoceras Tomlin 1931
Okhototrachyceras Konstantinov 2012
Trachyceratinae Haug 1894
Austrotrachyceras Krystyn 1978
Muensterites Mojsisovics 1893
Trachyceras Laube 1869
Neoprotrachyceras Krystyn 1978
Arpaditinae Hyatt 1900
Arctoarpadites Tozer 1994
Arctosirenites Tozer 1961
Argolites Renz 1939
Arpadites Mojsisovics 1879
Dittmarites Mojsisovics 1893
Edmundites Diener 1916
Hisnitites Tozer 1994
Klipsteinia von Mojsisovics 1882
Liardites Tozer 1963
Meginoceras McLearn 1930
Otoarpadites Tozer 1994
Silenticeras McLearn 1930
Trachystenoceras Johnston 1941
Yakutosirenites Tozer 1994
Sirenitinae Tozer 1971
Anasirenites Mojsisovics 1893
Diplosirenites Mojsisovics 1893
Neosirenites Popov 1961
Norosirenites Tozer 1994
Orientosirenites Konstantinov 2018
Pamphagosirenites Popov 1961
Pseudosirenites Arthaber 1911
Pterosirenites Tozer 1980
Seimkanites Konstantinov 1999
Sirenites Mojsisovics 1893
Sirenotrachyceras Krystyn 1978
Striatosirenites Popov 1961
Vredenburgites Diener 1916
Protrachyceratinae Tozer 1971
Eoprotrachyceras Tozer 1980
Paratrachyceras Arthaber 1915
Protrachyceras Mojsisovics 1893
Spirogmoceras Silberling 1956
Anolcitinae Mietto and Manfrin 2008
Anolcites Mojsisovics 1893
Asklepioceras Renz 1910
Daxatina Strand 1929
Falsanolcites Rieber and Brack 2004
Frankites Tozer 1971
Maclearnoceras Tozer 1963
Zestoceras Tozer 1994
Haoceratinae Balini and Zou 2015
Haoceras Balini and Zou 2015
Sinomeginoceras Balini and Zou 2015

Gallery

References

Further reading
 Arkell et al. Mesozoic Ammonoidea. Treatise on Invertebrate Paleontology, Part L. 1957
 Bernhard Kummel 1952. A Classification of Triassic Ammonoids. Jour of Paleontology, Vol 26, No.5, pp 847–853, Sept 1952
 J. A. Pérez Valera. 2005. Ammonoideos y bioestratigrafía del Triásico Medio (Anisiense superior-Ladiniense) en la sección de Calasparra (sector oriental de la Cordillera Bética, Murcia, España). Coloquios de Paleontología 55:125-161
 P. Mietto and S. Manfrin. 2008. Selected ammonoid fauna from Prati Di Stuores/Stuores Wiesen and related sections across the Ladinian-Carnian boundary (southern Alps, Italy). Rivista Italiana di Paleontologia e Stratigrafia 114:377-429

 
Ceratitida families
Devonian first appearances
Triassic extinctions